Valentina Cervi (born 13 April 1976) is an Italian film and television actress.

Cervi was born in Rome, Italy. She is the daughter of director Tonino Cervi and granddaughter of actor Gino Cervi. Her mother is the Italian producer of Austrian-Hungarian origin Marina Gefter. Cervi started her acting career at age ten in Carlo Cotti's 1986 film Portami la luna. She also played an English-language role in Jane Campion's 1996 The Portrait of a Lady.

One of her most acclaimed roles was the lead in the 1997 film Artemisia, directed by Agnès Merlet. It was loosely based on the painter Artemisia Gentileschi's life, but controversially portrayed the relationship between Agostino Tassi (played by Miki Manojlović) and Artemisia as a passionate affair rather than as rape.

In 2011, she appeared as Arianna in BBC TV's Italian detective mini-series Zen. She also appeared as "Valentina" in Canale 5's series Distretto di Polizia in 2011.

Cervi appeared as Bertha Mason in Cary Fukunaga's 2011 film adaptation of Jane Eyre. She was cast as the ancient vampire Salome in the HBO television drama True Blood.

She is married to director Stefano Mordini and has two children, Margherita (b. 2013) and a son (b. 2016).

She received the America Award of the Italy-USA Foundation in 2018.

Filmography

Films

Television

References

External links 
 
 

1976 births
Living people
20th-century Italian actresses
21st-century Italian actresses
Actresses from Rome
Italian child actresses
Italian film actresses
Italian television actresses
Italian stage actresses
Italian people of Hungarian descent
Italian people of Austrian descent